The Van Nest–Hoff–Vannatta Farmstead is a historic property along Route 519 (Belvidere Rd.) in Harmony Township, New Jersey. It is administered by the Harmony Township Historical Society. The farmstead was added to the National Register of Historic Places on December 28, 2005, for its significance in agriculture and architecture.

The tract of 768 acres was first settled by John Van Nest in 1763, and subsequently owned by John and Abel Hoff during the early 19th century, followed by William M. Vannatta. In 1856, Vannatta (originally van Etten) acquired the southern half of what was by then a 590-acre tract containing the farmstead. Vannatta moved to the Italianate-style house overlooking the farmstead sometime in the 1860s, after which the farmstead was rented to a succession of tenant farmers. These tenant farmers included Jacob Fry in the 1860s, John Koch in the 1930s, Russell Reeder in the 1940s, and Shorty Featherman 1945–1960.

References

External links 
Official website

Museums in Warren County, New Jersey
Historic house museums in New Jersey
Houses in Warren County, New Jersey
Houses on the National Register of Historic Places in New Jersey
National Register of Historic Places in Warren County, New Jersey
New Jersey Register of Historic Places
Harmony Township, New Jersey